Maria Consuelo Gil Puyat-Reyes (born November 26, 1937 in Manila) is a Filipino politician and diplomat. She served as ambassador of the Philippines to Chile and as a congresswoman from Makati from 1987 to 1992.

Puyat-Reyes is the daughter of Deogracias Puyat, a lawyer, and Patria Gil. She is the granddaughter of Pedro Gil, a diplomat and legislator from Manila. She attended St. Paul's College where she earned her bachelor's degree in education. She also has a master's degree in business economics from the Center for Research and Communication. She was married to Gregorio Reyes.

Throughout the 1980s, Puyat-Reyes headed the annual anti-tuberculosis fund campaign organized by the Philippine Tuberculosis Society. In January 2000, the Makati Regional Trial Court ordered Puyat-Reyes to be arrested for failing to testify regarding the estate of her late husband. The case is about her and her stepdaughters, Christina and Rina.

References

1937 births
Living people
Ambassadors of the Philippines to Chile
Filipino women ambassadors
Members of the House of Representatives of the Philippines from Makati
PDP–Laban politicians